Guilford Paul Hans Paulsen (November 14, 1902 – April 2, 1994) was a pitcher in Major League Baseball. He played one game for the St. Louis Cardinals in 1925.

References

External links

1902 births
1994 deaths
Cornell Rams baseball players
Major League Baseball pitchers
St. Louis Cardinals players
Baseball players from Iowa
People from Palo Alto County, Iowa
Dayton Aviators players